Faustman is a surname. Notable people with the surname include:

Denise Faustman (born 1958), American physician and medical researcher
Hampe Faustman (1919–1961), Swedish actor and film director
Mollie Faustman (1883–1966), Swedish painter, illustrator, journalist, and author